South Kerry is a division of Kerry GAA. The South Kerry consists of club teams. It is primarily known for Gaelic football, though some hurling is also played. The division fields teams in the Kerry Senior Football Championship, Kerry Minor Football Championship, and Kerry Under-21 Football Championship.

Member clubs
 St Mary's Cahersiveen 
 Renard
 St Michael's/Foilmore
 Skellig Rangers
 Valentia
 Derrynane
 Dromid Pearses
 Waterville
 Sneem

The hurling team draws its players form the following 6 clubs:
 Tralee Parnells
 Kilgarvan
 Kenmare
 Dr Crokes
 St Patrick's
 Duagh
 Rathmore
South Kerry has won 10 Kerry Senior Football Championships, most recently beating Killarney Legion GAA in November 2015. They have never won the Kerry Senior Hurling Championship.

South Kerry Senior Football Championship
The South Kerry Senior Football Championship is a Gaelic football competition between clubs affiliated to the South Kerry division. The championship is played every year. Dromid Pearses were the champions of 2019.
St Mary's is the most successful club, with 34 titles won in its history.

Fionan Clifford - Waterville
Killian Young - Renard
Robert Wharton - Renard
Bryan Sheehan - St Mary’s 

Paul O'Donoghue - St Mary's Cahirciveern
Matthew O'Sullivan - St Michael's/Foilmore
Daniel Daly - St Mary’s

Current management team
As of March 2021:
Manager: Seán O'Sullivan
Selectors: Ronan Hussey, Denis (Shine) O'Sullivan
Strength and conditioning coach: Alan Duggan

Notable players
]
 John Egan
 Maurice Fitzgerald
 Ger Lynch
 Mick O'Dwyer
 Mick O'Connell
 Ger O'Driscoll
 Jack O'Shea
 Declan O'Sullivan
 Bryan Sheehan
 Killian Young

Honours
 Senior County Championship (10): 1955, 1956, 1958, 1981, 1982, 2004, 2005, 2006, 2009, 2015
 Kerry Under 21 Football Championship (12): 1984, 1987, 1988, 1991, 1992, 1993, 2003, 2004, 2005, 2007, 2010, 2016
 Kerry Minor Football Championship (9): 1963, 1970, 1971, 1975, 1992, 1999, 2000, 2001, 2005

References

External links
South Kerry Website
Derrynane Club Website
Waterville Club Website
Valentia Young Islanders Club
St. Mary's Cahirciveen Website
Renard Club Website
Dromid Pearses Club Website
Kerry GAA site

Divisional boards of Kerry GAA
Gaelic games clubs in County Kerry